NATO reporting name for AT series anti-tank guided missiles, with Soviet designations:

 AT-1 Snapper (3M6 Shmel)
 AT-2 Swatter (3M11 Falanga)
 AT-3 Sagger (9M14 Malyutka)
 AT-4 Spigot (9M111 Fagot)
 AT-5 Spandrel (9M113 Konkurs)
 AT-6 Spiral (9M114 Shturm)
 AT-7 Saxhorn (9M115 Metis)
 AT-8 Songster (9M112 Kobra)
 AT-9 Spiral-2 (9M120 Ataka) 
 AT-10 Stabber (9M117 Bastion)
 AT-11 Sniper (9M119 Svir" / "Refleks)
 AT-12 Swinger (9M118 Sheksna)
 AT-13 Saxhorn-2 (9M131 Metis-M)
 АТ-14 Spriggan (9M133 Kornet)
 АТ-15 Springer (9M123 Khrizantema)
 AT-16 Scallion (9A1472? Vikhr / Vikhr-M?)
 Hermes (missile) air-launched: anti-tank option.

See also
 NATO reporting name
 List of anti-tank guided missiles

External links 
 Antitank weapons at armscontrol.ru.
  Designations of Soviet and Russian Military Aircraft and Missiles

anti-tank missiles